Job Roberts Tyson (February 8, 1803 – June 27, 1858) was an American lawyer and politician. He was a member of the Whig Party and served one term in the U.S. House of Representatives from Pennsylvania.

Biography
Job Tyson was born in Philadelphia, Pennsylvania to Joseph Tyson and Ann Van Tromp. He was descended from a Quaker family that settled in the Pennsylvania colony in 1683.

Early in life, he had a strong interest in literature, which served as a basis for his education. At the age of 17, he took a position as a teacher in Hamburg, Pennsylvania, where he taught colloquial English to German speaking students of the area. In doing so, he also learned to speak German himself.

After returning to Philadelphia, Roberts Vaux, an early founder of the public school system, helped him obtain work as a teacher in the first public school in Philadelphia. He also devoted himself to study and learned Latin, Greek and Hebrew. After two years, he was appointed as the Director of Public Schools in Philadelphia.

He began studying law in 1825 under Rep. John Wurts. He was admitted to the bar in 1827 and practiced law in Philadelphia.

Tyson often wrote and spoke about history and law. The Law Academy of Philadelphia published an essay he wrote about the penal system of Philadelphia. He delivered speeches on the trial of William Penn and the history of Pennsylvania.

In 1833, he was commissioned by Philadelphians concerned about gambling to write about the problems of lotteries. Lotteries at the time were a common means of raising funds for public and private projects. Benjamin Franklin was involved in organizing the first public lottery in Philadelphia and used them for establishing fire companies and a militia. Tyson wrote several works on the subject including  A Brief Survey of the Great Extent and Evil Tendencies of the Lottery System, as Existing in the United States in 1833 and The Lottery System in the United States in 1837 that argued for the end of lotteries as a destructive human behavior. Although the movement against lotteries began with the Quakers, other denominations came out against lotteries with Tyson’s forceful argument against the practice. Nine states eventually banned lotteries by 1835 and new states barred lotteries in the constitutions.

In 1836, he was as a member elected to the American Philosophical Society.

In 1846, Tyson began speaking about the need for a railroad connection between Philadelphia and Pittsburgh. He delivered an address on April 28, 1846 to a group of influential citizens and continued to press the issue. Tyson was elected to the Select Council, the upper house of the Philadelphia City Council and pushed the city towards the establishment of what became the Pennsylvania Railroad.

In 1854, Tyson was elected As a Whig to the Thirty-fourth Congress.  As a member of Congress, he spoke forcefully in favor of the expulsion of Preston Brooks, who had assaulted Senator Charles Sumner.

Towards the end of his term, he delivered a speech on fugitive slaves laws in which he argued for a return to the principles of the Compromise of 1850. In it, while he noted that he opposed slavery, Tyson argued that Africans, born free or as slaves, were better off, “elevated in character, and improved in condition and happiness, by his residence among a religious, an educated and a free people.” Further, he stated that “The natural inferiority of the negro is physically and metaphysically, a fact.”

At the end of his first term, Tyson declined to run again, finding that party loyalty made it difficult to act in the best interests of the country.

Personal life
Tyson married Eleanor Cope in 1832. His wife died in 1847. They had no children. He died on his estate, "Woodlawn," in Montgomery County, Pennsylvania, on June 27, 1858.  Interment in Laurel Hill Cemetery in Philadelphia.

References

The Political Graveyard

1803 births
1858 deaths
Members of the Pennsylvania House of Representatives
Politicians from Philadelphia
Pennsylvania lawyers
Whig Party members of the United States House of Representatives from Pennsylvania
Burials at Laurel Hill Cemetery (Philadelphia)
19th-century American politicians
19th-century American lawyers